"Y Todo Queda en Nada" (English: And Everything Ends in Nothing) is a ballad performed by the Puerto Rican-American recording artist Ricky Martin from his seventh studio album and fifth made in Spanish Almas del Silencio (2003). It was released as the album's fifth promotional single by Sony Discos and Columbia Records on November 17, 2003 in the Latin territories. It was written by Estéfano and co-wrriten by Julio Reyes Copello, while the production was in charge of Estéfano.

Music video
Gustavo Garzón directed the music video for "Y Todo Queda en Nada". He previously worked with Ricky Martin on the videos for "Te Extraño, Te Olvido, Te Amo", "Fuego de Noche, Nieve de Día" and "Perdido Sin Ti". It stars Venezuelan model Luzia Vivas, who in an interview said:

 

The clip was filmed in different locations in Mexico City during his visit to the country and was premiered in the program ¡Despierta América!, of the Univision chain.

Chart performance
The song reached number one on the Hot Latin Tracks in the United States and stayed at the top for one week. It also peaked at number two on the Latin Pop Airplay and Tropical Songs.

Awards and nominations

Formats and track listings
Mexican promotional CD single
"Y Todo Queda en Nada" – 4:37

Argentinian promotional CD single
"Y Todo Queda en Nada" – 4:37

Charts

Weekly charts

Year-end charts

See also
List of number-one Billboard Hot Latin Tracks of 2004

References

2003 singles
2003 songs
Ricky Martin songs
2000s ballads
Latin ballads
Pop ballads
Songs written by Estéfano
Songs written by Julio Reyes Copello
Sony Discos singles
Columbia Records singles
Song recordings produced by Estéfano

th:มายเลิฟ (เพลงเซลีน ดิออน)